The 2019 Washington Justice season was the first season of Washington Justice's existence in the Overwatch League as one of eight expansion franchises added for the 2019 season. The Justice struggled throughout the first three stages of the season, posting a 2–19 record in the first 21 games. However, the Justice flourished after the League's implementation of an enforced 2-2-2 role lock for Stage 4, as the team lost only one match in their final seven games to finish the season in 17th place with an 8–20 record.

Preceding offseason 
On September 12, Washington announced the signing of former New York Excelsior coach Kim "WizardHyeong" Hyeong-seok as the team's head coach. Eight days later, Washington signed Molly "AVALLA" Kim as an analyst; AVALLA is the first female coach to be signed in the history of the Overwatch League. Justice announced its inaugural season starting roster between September and December, consisting of the following players:
Song "Janus" Junhwa,
Kim "Sansam" Hyang-ki,
Ethan "Stratus" Yankel,
Corey "Corey" Nigra,
Chon "Ado" Gi-hyeon,
Moon "Gido" Gi-do,
Riley "Fahzix" Taylor, and
Cho "Hyeonu" Hyeon-woo.

Regular season 
The Justice's first regular season match was against the New York Excelsior on February 16; Washington lost the series 1–3. The team lost their first six matches of the season. Washington's final match of Stage 1 was against the Florida Mayhem on March 17; the Justice won 3–2, giving the franchise their first-ever win, and ended the stage with a 1–6 record. The following day, the Justice acquired support player Hong "ArK" Yeon-jun from New York Excelsior.

On April 19, in the middle of Stage 2, the Justice acquired support Nikola "Sleepy" Andrews from the San Francisco Shock. In Stage 2, the Justice again lost their first six matches. Their final match of Stage 2 was against the Boston Uprising. Washing took a 3–2 win and finished Stage 2 with a 1–6 record.

In Stage 3, week 2, the Justice faced the Hangzhou Spark on June 15. In the match, Washington was handed one of the most dominant map losses in the history of the Overwatch League on Hollywood, as the team only secured two eliminations in the entire map. The Justice lost all seven of their matches in Stage 3.

Prior to the start of Stage 4, which would include the implementation of an enforced 2-2-2 role lock by the League, the Justice signed tanks Elliot "ELLIVOTE" Vaneryd and Lukas "LullSiSH" Wiklund from the Dallas Fuel's academy team Team Envy. The Justice's first match of Stage 4 was against the Toronto Defiant on July 26; Washington came out of the match with a 3–1 victory, ending their seven-game losing streak. The following week, the team took on the league-leading Vancouver Titans. In a major upset, the Justice handed the Titans their first ever 0–4 loss and only their second loss in the entire regular season. DPS Corey "Corey" Nigra led the Justice throughout the match and broke the Overwatch League record for critical hit accuracy while playing as the hero Hanzo. The team continued to thrive under the 2-2-2 rule, going undefeated in their first four matches of the stage. The winning streak increased to five after defeating the Houston Outlaws on August 11. The Justice's first loss of the stage was on August 16 against the Atlanta Reign. The team's final match of the regular season was against the Paris Eternal two days later; Washington won 3–1.

Final roster

Transactions 
Transactions of/for players on the roster during the 2019 regular season:
On March 18, Justice acquired Hong "ArK Yeon-jun from New York Excelsior.
On April 19, Justice acquired Nikola "Sleepy" Andrews from San Francisco Shock.
On July 14, Justice signed Elliot "ELLIVOTE" Vaneryd and Lukas "LullSiSH" Wiklund.
On August 12, Justice released Riley "Fahzix" Taylor.

Standings

Record by stage

League

Game log

References 

2019 Overwatch League seasons by team
Washington Justice
Washington Justice seasons